George K. Fraenkel (July 27, 1921 – June 10, 2009) was an American physical chemist, dean of Graduate School of Arts and Sciences and chairman of the chemistry department at Columbia University.
  Fraenkel was noted for his research of electron spin resonance.  He also pioneered in the use of electronic techniques to study structures of molecules.

Biography

Background
Fraenkel was born on July 27, 1921, in Deal, New Jersey.  He grew up in Scarsdale, New York.

Education
In 1942, he graduated magna cum laude and Phi Beta Kappa from Harvard.  During World War II, he was hired by the National Defense Research Committee.  After the war, he graduated Cornell with a doctorate in 1949.

Career
Fraenkel joined Columbia’s chemistry department in 1949.  He served as the department's chair from 1965 to 1968.  From 1968 to 1983, he served as dean of Graduate School of Arts & Science. In 1971, Fraenkel oversaw the closure of the linguistics program at Columbia, under his recommendations.

In 1983, he became a vice president for special projects.  From 1986 to 1991, he returned to the chemistry department.  He retired in 1991 as Higgins Professor Emeritus and Dean Emeritus.

Retirement

At the time of his death, he also served as Director and Treasurer of the Atran Foundation in New York City.

Private life and death
Fraenkel died in Manhattan on June 10, 2009, aged 87.  Surviving him were his wife, Eva Stolz Gilleran Cantwell and six stepchildren.

Awards
In 1972, Fraenkel received the Harold C. Urey Award of the Gamma Chapter of Phi Lambda Upsilon.

In 1981, he received the Title of Officer dans l’Ordre des Palmes Academiques (1981).

Contributions
Fraenkel developed instruments to "track the spin of electrons and thereby obtain information on very small structures," according to an obituary in The New York Times. "We are now determining the structure and function of medically important proteins implicated in Parkinson's disease, how viral proteins insert themselves into cells, medical imaging, memory function and quantum computing," said Jack H. Freed, professor of physical chemistry at Cornell, in reference to developments based on Fraenkel's work.

References 

1921 births
2009 deaths
People from Deal, New Jersey
Harvard University alumni
Cornell University alumni
Columbia University faculty
American physical chemists
People from Scarsdale, New York
Scientists from New York (state)
Fellows of the American Physical Society